Behind Closed Doors is an American spy drama television series. It stars Bruce Gordon and aired on NBC during the 1958–1959 television season.

Synopsis
An anthology series, Behind Closed Doors each week depicted international intrigue and Western counterespionage incidents during the Cold War. United States Navy Commander Matson both hosts the series and appears as a character in some of its episodes. Rear Admiral Ellis M. Zacharias provides comments at the end of each episode.

Cast
 Bruce Gordon...Commander Matson
 Rear Admiral (ret.) Ellis M. Zacharias...Himself

Production
Harry Ackerman, then vice-president of Screen Gems, created Behind Closed Doors. 

The episodes of Behind Closed Doors are based on the files of Rear Admiral Ellis M. Zacharias, who served in the United States Navy from 1912 to 1946 and spent a 25-year career in naval intelligence, culminating in a tour as the Deputy Director of Naval Intelligence. The title of the series was the same as that of a book he had written, and he served as the technical consultant for the series. His files covered real-life events of the era before the Cold War, so although inspired by real-life pre-Cold War events, the storylines of Behind Closed Doors were updated, relocated, and fictionalized to depict the Cold War period. Zacharias's comments at the end of each episode highlighted the themes and lessons of the episode.

Behind Closed Doors was a Screen Gems production. Sam Gallu was its executive producer, and Sidney Marshall produced the series.

Whitehall Pharmaceuticals and Liggett & Myers Tobacco Company were the sponsors. The show's main competition was Dick Powell's Zane Grey Theatre and Pat Boone's program.

Broadcast history

Behind Closed Doors premiered on October 2, 1958, and 26 episodes were produced. It aired on NBC on Thursdays at 9:00 p.m. Eastern Time. The show was cancelled after a single season, and its last episode was broadcast on April 9, 1959.

Episodes
SOURCE

References

External links
 
 Opening of Behind Closed Doors Episode 22 "Mightier Than the Sword" on YouTube
 Behind Closed Doors Episode 1 "The Cape Canaveral Story" on YouTube

1950s American drama television series
American spy drama television series
1958 American television series debuts
1959 American television series endings
Black-and-white American television shows
NBC original programming
Television shows set in the United States
English-language television shows
Television series about the Cold War